Javier Victor Ortiz (born January 22, 1963) is a retired Major League Baseball outfielder. He played during two seasons at the major league level for the Houston Astros. He was drafted by the Texas Rangers in the 1st round (4th pick) of the 1983 amateur draft. Ortiz played his first professional season with their Class A Burlington Rangers in 1983, and his last season with the Chicago White Sox's Triple-A affiliate, the Nashville Sounds, in 1995.

See also

List of Florida Gators baseball players
List of Major League Baseball players from Cuba

References

External links

1963 births
Living people
Albuquerque Dukes players
Baseball players from Massachusetts
Burlington Rangers players
Carolina Mudcats players
Florida Gators baseball players
Houston Astros players
Major League Baseball outfielders
Nashville Sounds players
Oklahoma City 89ers players
Omaha Royals players
San Antonio Missions players
St. Paul Saints players
Tucson Toros players
Tulsa Drillers players